The 2023 Los Angeles Dodgers season will be the 134th season for the Los Angeles Dodgers franchise in Major League Baseball, their 66th season in Los Angeles, California, and their 61st season playing their home games at Dodger Stadium.

Offseason

Broadcasting team
Longtime Dodgers Spanish broadcaster Jaime Jarrín retired after the 2022 season. Jarrin had been their Spanish broadcaster for 64 years, the third-longest tenure an individual spent with a single team (only the late Vin Scully, at 67 years, and the late Tommy Lasorda, at 69 years, were with one team for longer than him - both also with the Dodgers).  On January 20, the Dodgers announced that they had hired Stephen Nelson to join the English-language broadcast team on SportsNet LA.

Coaching staff
On November 28, hitting coach Brant Brown left the Dodgers for a new position as hitting coach for the Miami Marlins. On February 1, Danny Lehmann was promoted to the bench coach position, replacing Bob Geren who was named major league field coordinator.

Roster departures
The Dodgers started their offseason moves on October 22, 2022, by outrighting pitcher Beau Burrows to the minors, causing him to become a free agent. On November 6, the day after the 2022 World Series ended, 10 Dodgers players officially became free agents: pitchers Tyler Anderson, Andrew Heaney, Tommy Kahnle, Clayton Kershaw, Craig Kimbrel, Chris Martin, David Price, shortstop Trea Turner and outfielders Joey Gallo and Kevin Pillar. On November 8, the Dodgers declined the 2023 club options on infielder Hanser Alberto and pitchers Jimmy Nelson and Danny Duffy, making them free agents. On November 10, they declined the 2023 option on longtime third baseman Justin Turner, making him a free agent. On November 18, the Dodgers non tendered outfielder Cody Bellinger and infielder Edwin Ríos. On January 6, the Dodgers designated pitcher Trevor Bauer, who had been suspended for the entire 2022 season, for assignment.

Roster additions
On November 8, the Dodgers acquired utility player Luke Williams via a waiver claim from the Miami Marlins, however he was non-tendered on November 18. On November 15, the Dodgers added four minor leaguers to the 40-man roster, catcher Diego Cartaya, infielder Michael Busch and outfielders Jonny DeLuca and Andy Pages. On November 18, they claimed pitcher Jake Reed off waivers from the Boston Red Sox, though he was later designated for assignment on December 29. On December 1, the Dodgers signed pitcher Shelby Miller to a one-year, $1.5 million, contract. Clayton Kershaw agreed to return to the Dodgers, signing a one-year $15 million contract on December 5. On December 14, the Dodgers traded minor league pitcher Jeff Belge to the Tampa Bay Rays in exchange for pitcher J. P. Feyereisen. On December 15, they acquired infielder Yonny Hernández from the Oakland Athletics for cash considerations. On December 16, they finalized a one-year, $13 million, contract with pitcher Noah Syndergaard. On December 29, they signed designated hitter J. D. Martinez to a one-year, $10 million, contract. On January 11, they acquired infielder Miguel Rojas from the Miami Marlins in exchange for Jacob Amaya. On February 16, the Dodgers added three more players to the roster on one-year deals, outfielder David Peralta and pitchers Alex Reyes and Jimmy Nelson.

Spring training

Gavin Lux was expected to become the Dodgers starting shortstop for the 2023 season. However on February 27 his knee buckled while running the bases in a Cactus League game and he was diagnosed with a torn anterior cruciate ligament in his knee, ending his season.

World Baseball Classic 

13 members of the Dodgers organization were selected to national team rosters for the 2023 World Baseball Classic. Mookie Betts, Will Smith, Clayton Kershaw and third base coach Dino Ebel were part of the US Team; Freddie Freeman was chosen to play for the Canadian team; Julio Urías and Austin Barnes for Team Mexico; Miguel Rojas for Venezuela, Trayce Thompson for Great Britain, Adam Kolarek for Israel, and minor leaguers José Ramos (for Panama) and Liam Doolan (for Australia). Kershaw wound up not being able to participate.

Regular season

Season standings

National League West

National League Wild Card

Game Log

|- bgcolor=
| 1 || March 30 || Diamondbacks || – || || || — || || –
|- bgcolor= 
| 2 || March 31 || Diamondbacks || – || || || — || || –
|- bgcolor= 
| 3 || April 1 || Diamondbacks || – || || || — || || –
|- bgcolor= 
| 4 || April 2 || Diamondbacks || – || || || — || || –
|- bgcolor= 
| 5 || April 3 || Rockies || – || || || — || || –
|- bgcolor= 
| 6 || April 4 || Rockies || – || || || — || || –
|- bgcolor= 
| 7 || April 6 || @ Diamondbacks || – || || || — || || –
|- bgcolor= 
| 8 || April 7 || @ Diamondbacks || – || || || — || || –
|- bgcolor= 
| 9 || April 8 || @ Diamondbacks || – || || || — || || –
|- bgcolor= 
| 10 || April 9 || @ Diamondbacks || – || || || — || || –
|- bgcolor= 
| 11 || April 10 || @ Giants || – || || || — || || –
|- bgcolor= 
| 12 || April 11 || @ Giants || – || || || — || || –
|- bgcolor= 
| 13 || April 12 || @ Giants || – || || || — || || –
|- bgcolor= 
| 14 || April 14 || Cubs || – || || || — || || –
|- bgcolor= 
| 15 || April 15 || Cubs || – || || || — || || –
|- bgcolor= 
| 16 || April 16 || Cubs || – || || || — || || –
|- bgcolor= 
| 17 || April 17 || Mets || – || || || — || || –
|- bgcolor= 
| 18 || April 18 || Mets || – || || || — || || –
|- bgcolor= 
| 19 || April 19 || Mets || – || || || — || || –
|- bgcolor= 
| 20 || April 20 || @ Cubs || – || || || — || || –
|- bgcolor= 
| 21 || April 21 || @ Cubs || – || || || — || || –
|- bgcolor= 
| 22 || April 22 || @ Cubs || – || || || — || || –
|- bgcolor= 
| 23 || April 23 || @ Cubs || – || || || — || || –
|- bgcolor= 
| 24 || April 25 || @ Pirates || – || || || — || || –
|- bgcolor= 
| 25 || April 26 || @ Pirates || – || || || — || || –
|- bgcolor= 
| 26 || April 27 || @ Pirates || – || || || — || || –
|- bgcolor= 
| 27 || April 28 || Cardinals || – || || || — || || –
|- bgcolor= 
| 28 || April 29 || Cardinals || – || || || — || || –
|- bgcolor= 
| 29 || April 30 || Cardinals || – || || || — || || –
|- 
 

|- bgcolor= 
| 30 || May 1 || Phillies || – || || || — || || –
|- bgcolor= 
| 31 || May 2 || Phillies || – || || || — || || –
|- bgcolor= 
| 32 || May 3 || Phillies || – || || || — || || –
|- bgcolor= 
| 33 || May 5 || @ Padres || – || || || — || || –
|- bgcolor= 
| 34 || May 6 || @ Padres || – || || || — || || –
|- bgcolor= 
| 35 || May 7 || @ Padres || – || || || — || || –
|- bgcolor= 
| 36 || May 8 || @ Brewers || – || || || — || || –
|- bgcolor= 
| 37 || May 9 || @ Brewers || – || || || — || || –
|- bgcolor= 
| 38 || May 10 || @ Brewers || – || || || — || || –
|- bgcolor= 
| 39 || May 12 || Padres || – || || || — || || –
|- bgcolor= 
| 40 || May 13 || Padres || – || || || — || || –
|- bgcolor= 
| 41 || May 14 || Padres || – || || || — || || –
|- bgcolor= 
| 42 || May 15 || Twins || – || || || — || || –
|- bgcolor= 
| 43 || May 16 || Twins || – || || || — || || –
|- bgcolor= 
| 44 || May 17 || Twins || – || || || — || || –
|- bgcolor= 
| 45 || May 18 || @ Cardinals || – || || || — || || –
|- bgcolor= 
| 46 || May 19 || @ Cardinals || – || || || — || || –
|- bgcolor= 
| 47 || May 20 || @ Cardinals || – || || || — || || –
|- bgcolor= 
| 48 || May 21 || @ Cardinals || – || || || — || || –
|- bgcolor= 
| 49 || May 22 || @ Braves || – || || || — || || –
|- bgcolor= 
| 50 || May 23 || @ Braves || – || || || — || || –
|- bgcolor= 
| 51 || May 24 || @ Braves || – || || || — || || –
|- bgcolor= 
| 52 || May 26 || @ Rays || – || || || — || || –
|- bgcolor= 
| 53 || May 27 || @ Rays || – || || || — || || –
|- bgcolor= 
| 54 || May 28 || @ Rays || – || || || — || || –
|- bgcolor= 
| 55 || May 29 || Nationals || – || || || — || || –
|- bgcolor= 
| 56 || May 30 || Nationals || – || || || — || || –
|- bgcolor= 
| 57 || May 31 || Nationals || – || || || — || || –
|- 
 

|- bgcolor= 
| 58 || June 2 || Yankees || – || || || — || || –
|- bgcolor= 
| 59 || June 3 || Yankees || – || || || — || || –
|- bgcolor= 
| 60 || June 4 || Yankees || – || || || — || || –
|- bgcolor= 
| 61 || June 6 || @ Reds || – || || || — || || –
|- bgcolor= 
| 62 || June 7 || @ Reds || – || || || — || || –
|- bgcolor= 
| 63 || June 8 || @ Reds || – || || || — || || –
|- bgcolor= 
| 64 || June 9 || @ Phillies || – || || || — || || –
|- bgcolor= 
| 65 || June 10 || @ Phillies || – || || || — || || –
|- bgcolor= 
| 66 || June 11 || @ Phillies || – || || || — || || –
|- bgcolor= 
| 67 || June 13 || White Sox || – || || || — || || –
|- bgcolor= 
| 68 || June 14 || White Sox || – || || || — || || –
|- bgcolor= 
| 69 || June 15 || White Sox || – || || || — || || –
|- bgcolor= 
| 70 || June 16 || Giants || – || || || — || || –
|- bgcolor= 
| 71 || June 17 || Giants || – || || || — || || –
|- bgcolor= 
| 72 || June 18 || Giants || – || || || — || || –
|- bgcolor= 
| 73 || June 20 || @ Angels || – || || || — || || –
|- bgcolor= 
| 74 || June 21 || @ Angels || – || || || — || || –
|- bgcolor= 
| 75 || June 23 || Astros || – || || || — || || –
|- bgcolor= 
| 76 || June 24 || Astros || – || || || — || || –
|- bgcolor= 
| 77 || June 25 || Astros || – || || || — || || –
|- bgcolor= 
| 78 || June 27 || @ Rockies || – || || || — || || –
|- bgcolor= 
| 79 || June 28 || @ Rockies || – || || || — || || –
|- bgcolor= 
| 80 || June 29 || @ Rockies || – || || || — || || –
|- bgcolor= 
| 81 || June 30 || @ Royals || – || || || — || || –
|- 
 

|- bgcolor= 
| 82 || July 1 || @ Royals || – || || || — || || –
|- bgcolor= 
| 83 || July 2 || @ Royals || – || || || — || || –
|- bgcolor= 
| 84 || July 3 || Pirates || – || || || — || || –
|- bgcolor= 
| 85 || July 4 || Pirates || – || || || — || || –
|- bgcolor= 
| 86 || July 5 || Pirates || – || || || — || || –
|- bgcolor= 
| 87 || July 6 || Pirates || – || || || — || || –
|- bgcolor= 
| 88 || July 7 || Angels || – || || || — || || –
|- bgcolor= 
| 89 || July 8 || Angels || – || || || — || || –
|- bgcolor="bbbbbb"
| – || July 11 || 93rd All-Star Game || colspan=6 | National League vs. American League (T-Mobile Park, Seattle, Washington)
|- bgcolor= 
| 90 || July 14 || @ Mets || – || || || — || || –
|- bgcolor= 
| 91 || July 15 || @ Mets || – || || || — || || –
|- bgcolor= 
| 92 || July 16 || @ Mets || – || || || — || || –
|- bgcolor= 
| 93 || July 17 || @ Orioles || – || || || — || || –
|- bgcolor= 
| 94 || July 18 || @ Orioles || – || || || — || || –
|- bgcolor= 
| 95 || July 19 || @ Orioles || – || || || — || || –
|- bgcolor= 
| 96 || July 21 || @ Rangers || – || || || — || || –
|- bgcolor= 
| 97 || July 22 || @ Rangers || – || || || — || || –
|- bgcolor= 
| 98 || July 23 || @ Rangers || – || || || — || || –
|- bgcolor= 
| 99 || July 24 || Blue Jays || – || || || — || || –
|- bgcolor= 
| 100 || July 25 || Blue Jays || – || || || — || || –
|- bgcolor= 
| 101 || July 26 || Blue Jays || – || || || — || || –
|- bgcolor= 
| 102 || July 28 || Reds || – || || || — || || –
|- bgcolor= 
| 103 || July 29 || Reds || – || || || — || || –
|- bgcolor= 
| 104 || July 30 || Reds || – || || || — || || –
|- 
 

|- bgcolor= 
| 105 || August 1 || Athletics || – || || || — || || –
|- bgcolor= 
| 106 || August 2 || Athletics || – || || || — || || –
|- bgcolor= 
| 107 || August 3 || Athletics || – || || || — || || –
|- bgcolor= 
| 108 || August 4 || @ Padres || – || || || — || || –
|- bgcolor= 
| 109 || August 5 || @ Padres || – || || || — || || –
|- bgcolor= 
| 110 || August 6 || @ Padres || – || || || — || || –
|- bgcolor= 
| 111 || August 7 || @ Padres || – || || || — || || –
|- bgcolor= 
| 112 || August 8 || @ Diamondbacks || – || || || — || || –
|- bgcolor= 
| 113 || August 9 || @ Diamondbacks || – || || || — || || –
|- bgcolor= 
| 114 || August 10 || Rockies || – || || || — || || –
|- bgcolor= 
| 115 || August 11 || Rockies || – || || || — || || –
|- bgcolor= 
| 116 || August 12 || Rockies || – || || || — || || –
|- bgcolor= 
| 117 || August 13 || Rockies || – || || || — || || –
|- bgcolor= 
| 118 || August 15 || Brewers || – || || || — || || –
|- bgcolor= 
| 119 || August 16 || Brewers || – || || || — || || –
|- bgcolor= 
| 120 || August 17 || Brewers || – || || || — || || –
|- bgcolor= 
| 121 || August 18 || Marlins || – || || || — || || –
|- bgcolor= 
| 122 || August 19 || Marlins || – || || || — || || –
|- bgcolor= 
| 123 || August 20 || Marlins || – || || || — || || –
|- bgcolor= 
| 124 || August 22 || @ Guardians || – || || || — || || –
|- bgcolor= 
| 125 || August 23 || @ Guardians || – || || || — || || –
|- bgcolor= 
| 126 || August 24 || @ Guardians || – || || || — || || –
|- bgcolor= 
| 127 || August 25 || @ Red Sox || – || || || — || || –
|- bgcolor= 
| 128 || August 26 || @ Red Sox || – || || || — || || –
|- bgcolor= 
| 129 || August 27 || @ Red Sox || – || || || — || || –
|- bgcolor= 
| 130 || August 28 || Diamondbacks || – || || || — || || –
|- bgcolor= 
| 131 || August 29 || Diamondbacks || – || || || — || || –
|- bgcolor= 
| 132 || August 30 || Diamondbacks || – || || || — || || –
|- bgcolor= 
| 133 || August 31 || Braves || – || || || — || || –
|- 
 

|- bgcolor= 
| 134 || September 1 || Braves || – || || || — || || –
|- bgcolor= 
| 135 || September 2 || Braves || – || || || — || || –
|- bgcolor= 
| 136 || September 3 || Braves || – || || || — || || –
|- bgcolor= 
| 137 || September 5 || @ Marlins || – || || || — || || –
|- bgcolor= 
| 138 || September 6 || @ Marlins || – || || || — || || –
|- bgcolor= 
| 139 || September 7 || @ Marlins || – || || || — || || –
|- bgcolor= 
| 140 || September 8 || @ Nationals || – || || || — || || –
|- bgcolor= 
| 141 || September 9 || @ Nationals || – || || || — || || –
|- bgcolor= 
| 142 || September 10 || @ Nationals || – || || || — || || –
|- bgcolor= 
| 143 || September 11 || Padres || – || || || — || || –
|- bgcolor= 
| 144 || September 12 || Padres || – || || || — || || –
|- bgcolor= 
| 145 || September 13 || Padres || – || || || — || || –
|- bgcolor= 
| 146 || September 15 || @ Mariners || – || || || — || || –
|- bgcolor= 
| 147 || September 16 || @ Mariners || – || || || — || || –
|- bgcolor= 
| 148 || September 17 || @ Mariners || – || || || — || || –
|- bgcolor= 
| 149 || September 18 || Tigers || – || || || — || || –
|- bgcolor= 
| 150 || September 19 || Tigers || – || || || — || || –
|- bgcolor= 
| 151 || September 20 || Tigers || – || || || — || || –
|- bgcolor= 
| 152 || September 21 || Giants || – || || || — || || –
|- bgcolor= 
| 153 || September 22 || Giants || – || || || — || || –
|- bgcolor= 
| 154 || September 23 || Giants || – || || || — || || –
|- bgcolor= 
| 155 || September 24 || Giants || – || || || — || || –
|- bgcolor= 
| 156 || September 26  || @ Rockies || – || || || — || || –
|- bgcolor= 
| 157 || September 26  || @ Rockies || – || || || — || || –
|- bgcolor= 
| 158 || September 27 || @ Rockies || – || || || — || || –
|- bgcolor= 
| 159 || September 28 || @ Rockies || – || || || — || || –
|- bgcolor= 
| 160 || September 29 || @ Giants || – || || || — || || –
|- bgcolor= 
| 161 || September 30 || @ Giants || – || || || — || || –
|- bgcolor= 
| 162 || October 1 || @ Giants || – || || || — || || –
|-

|-
| Legend:       = Win       = Loss       = PostponementBold = Dodgers team member

Roster

Farm system

References

External links
2023 Los Angeles Dodgers season at Official Site
2023 Los Angeles Dodgers season at Baseball Reference

Los Angeles Dodgers
Los Angeles Dodgers
Los Angeles Dodgers seasons
Dodgers